Nebria shibanaii is a species of ground beetle in the Nebriinae subfamily that can be found in Japan and Russia.

Subspecies
Nebria shibanaii sakagutii Nakane, 1957 Japan
Nebria shibanaii shibanaii Ueno, 1955 Russia

References

shibanaii
Beetles described in 1955
Beetles of Asia